Ari Lahti (born 1963) is a Finnish businessman, owner of KuPS of the Veikkausliiga and President of Football Association of Finland. He is the founder, owner, and chairman of Helsinki-based Ice Capital. He was formerly employed at the Bank of Finland, and was born in Leppävirta.

References

1963 births
Living people
People from Leppävirta
People educated at Atlantic College
Finnish businesspeople
Football Federation of Finland executives